Richard Basden (born 20 June 1967, in Bermuda) is a former Bermudian cricketer. He played six List A matches for Bermuda as part of the Red Stripe Bowl. He also played in the 2001 ICC Trophy, which was his last international appearance.

References

External links
Cricinfo profile
Cricket Archive profile

1967 births
Living people
Bermudian cricketers